Torbeo is a Galician parish of the municipality of Ribas de Sil, in Spain. The parish has a population of 82 inhabitants according to INE data for the year 2019. distributed in 12 localities. The parish is located on a slope south of the River Sil, within the Ribeira Sacra.

Geography
All these towns are surrounded by centenaries and splendid forests of chestnut trees. It has 481 ha of neighboring hills of the parish and a total area of 1620 ha.

In A Cubela there is a spectacular and famous meander called meander of A Cubela.

Location

Villages and neighborhoods
It has different population centers, which are:
 Los Vilares
 Moreiras de Abaixo
 Moreiras de Medio
 Moreiras de Arriba
 San Lourenzo 
 A Ventosa
 Torbeo 

Neighborhoods of Torbeo:
 O Barrio
 Campos
 O Carballiño
 Lama de Paio
 O Outeiro
 Pacios
 Paredes
 San Martiño
 A Cubela
 Filgueiro
 As Cortes
 As Pozas
 As Fontes

History 
Sebastián de Miñano, "Individual of the Royal Academy of History, and of the Society of Geography of Paris" published in 1828 the "Geographical and Statistical Dictionary of Spain" and says of Torbeo: "On the other side of this river finds the extensive and rich abbey and stump of Santa Maria de Torveo, on a very high slope and with several gorges populated with chestnut trees. " Torbeo was a city council, had 1030 inhabitants in 1827 and Floridablanca in 1785 defines Torbeo as "Coto Redondo, Ecclesiastical Manor and Secular Lordship, Province of Orense and Jurisdiction of Torbeo, with Ordinary Mayor of Secular Lordship". There is evidence of an important monastery from the 12th to the 16th century. There are many texts referring to Vasco Pérez de Quiroga (born in 1135), buried in the abbey of Torbeo and whose tombstone could be read; "Here is the Bon Quiroga rich ome of Castella, very gracious and charitable that no one should die of fame, requiescat in pace". In 1555, in the "Refranero or proverbs in romance" of Hernán Núñez, the following saying: "When you go to Torbeo leva or bread not seo". Its abbey has 100 vassals in the days of Felipe II.

Well-known is also Filomena Arias "The Witch or Wise of Torbeo", a singular case of curanderismo and divination in the deep Galicia of the end of the last century and beginning of the present. His fame was such that Torbeo came people from all over Galicia, León, Ponferrada and Asturias, in search of their miraculous remedies and their visions. The "work and miracles" of Filomena is present in numerous publications; in "Wood of Boj" by Camilo José Cela, in "Lendas Galician of oral tradition", in the "Guide of Galicia naxica", ...

Featured Places 
The most well-known monument is the 12th-century Romanesque church of Santa María, defined as "one of the best and most elegant examples of Galician rural Romanesque" in the book by D. José Ramón Fernández, published by the Instituto Diego Velázquez of the Higher Council of Scientific Research in 1945. Another well-known and singular building of Torbeo is the Pazo da Casa Nova.

On the other hand we also have the meander of A Cubela, in A Cubela.

Populated places in the Province of Lugo